From the Heart of a Woman is a blues album by Koko Taylor, released in January 1981 by Alligator Records.

Track listing
 "Something Strange Is Going On" (McQueen, Edwin Williams) – 4:01
 "I'd Rather Go Blind" (Billy Foster, Ellington Jordan) – 4:57
 "Keep Your Hands Off Him" (Priscilla Bowman, Jay McShann) – 3:49
 "Thanks, But No Thanks" (Edwin Williams) – 4:14
 "If You Got a Heartache" (Deadric Malone, Joe Scott) – 3:42
 "Never Trust a Man" (Edwin Williams) – 3:18
 "Sure Had a Wonderful Time Last Night" (Louis Jordan) – 3:05
 "Blow Top Blues" (Leonard Feather) – 4:15
 "If Walls Could Talk" (Bobby Miller) – 3:30
 "It Took a Long Time" (Koko Taylor) – 3:58

Personnel
Koko Taylor – vocals
Vino Louden  – bandleader, lead guitar
Criss Johnson – guitar
Sammy Lawhorn – guitar
Cornelius Boyson – bass
Bill Heid – keyboards
Vince Chappelle – drums
Doug Bartenfeld – keyboards, guitar
Billy Branch – harmonica
A.C. Reed – tenor saxophone

References

1981 albums
Koko Taylor albums
Albums produced by Bruce Iglauer
Alligator Records albums